The 46th Annual Annie Awards honoring excellence in the field of animation of 2018 took place on February 2, 2019, at the University of California, Los Angeles's Royce Hall in Los Angeles, California, and presented awards in 32 categories.

Production categories 
On December 3, 2018, the nominations were announced. Incredibles 2 earned the most number of nominations with 11, followed by Ralph Breaks the Internet with 10.

Individual achievement categories

Multiple awards and nominations

Films

The following films received multiple nominations:

The following films received multiple awards:

Television/Broadcast

The following television productions received multiple nominations:

The following television productions received multiple awards:

References

External links
 Complete list of 46th Annual Annie Awards nominees

2018
Annie
Annie
Annie
Annie